The Hontoon Dead River is a tributary of the St. Johns River in Volusia County, Florida.  Hontoon Island, home of Hontoon Island State Park is surrounded by the Hontoon, the St. Johns, and Snake Creek.

A "dead river" is one with virtually no current. The area is rich in wildlife, including manatees.

References

External links
 Hontoon Island State Park at Florida State Parks
 Wikimapia Geo Links for Hontoon Dead River

Rivers of Florida
Rivers of Volusia County, Florida
Tributaries of the St. Johns River